YCD is the IATA airport code of Nanaimo Airport in British Columbia, Canada.

YCD or Y.C.D. may also refer to:

 YCD Multimedia, a company based in New York
 Belarusian Young Christian Democrats
 The Young Childrens Division of the Minnesota Dance Theatre
 You Can Dance: Po prostu tańcz!, the Polish version of the franchise

See also
 WYCD, a radio station in Detroit, Michigan